Medi is a village in Gangapur City in Sawai Madhopur district in the Indian state of Rajasthan.

Geography 
Medi village is located near the Gambhir river and covers an area of about 16 square kilometers. 

The nearest towns are Wazirpur and Shri Mahabir ji . Shri Mahaveer is 10 kilometers away. 

Medi is closely associated with nearby Katkad village. They are often referred to together as Katkad-Medi. Other nearby villages include Khandip, Fulwada, Chhitar ki Jhopadi, Gurja, and Meena Baroda and Vadoli.

Demographics 
In 2011, its population was nearly 5000 people. The population density is 60/sq km (155/sq mi). The sex ratio is 990/1000 ♂/♀. The literacy rate is 80%.

Most of the families residing there belong to the Meena community, also known as Dudawat & Sapawat, amongst others including Swarnkar, Brahmin, Baniya, Kohli, Kumar and Muslim groups.

Education 
There is one senior secondary school and three private schools. Many villagers are teachers.

Economy 
The primary occupation of Medi citizens is agriculture, but many managers, doctors, and engineers live there. Major crops are Mirchi, Sarson, Bajra and wheat. The quality of Mirchi produced in this region is famous all over Rajasthan.

Other occupations include patwaris, J.En, X.Enrailway employees and even I.A.S Officers.

History 
The village Medi was founded in 1669 by two brothers from Madhya Pradesh, Sabalgarh district.

Transport 
The nearest railway station is Khandip Railway Station, which is about seven kilometers away.

Facilities 
Medi Village has many facilities. There is a branch of SBI bank with ATM near the main temple. A medical dispensary, a post office and a playground are available.

Temples 
More than eight temples are found in the village. The temple dedicated to god Narasimha also called Thakur Ji Ka Mandir by the locals, is located in the village center. Other temples include Kad dev Baba, a Hanuman Ji temple, Bhairon baba and Mahadevan Ji temple. Two temples belong to Kad Dev Ji. One is situated on the bank of Gambhir river.

Culture 
The main religious festivals are Deepawali, Holi, Gangaur, Teej, Gogaji, Makar Sankranti and Janmashtami, as the main religion is Hinduism. Rajasthan's desert festival is celebrated. This festival is held once a year during winter. Dressed in brilliantly-hued costumes, the people of the desert dance and sing ballads of valor, romance and tragedy. Fairs supply snake charmers, puppeteers, acrobats and folk performers. Camels play a role in this festival.

Schools 
Among the local schools are:

 Govt Senior Secondary School, Medi
 Hans Vidhya Mandir, Medi
 Rajiv Gandhi Pathshala, Med
 Govt Primary School, Medi

References 

 Villages in Sawai Madhopur district